Acronicta adaucta is a moth of the family Noctuidae first described by William Warren in 1909. It is found in the Korean Peninsula, Japan, north-eastern China and the Russian Far East (Primorye, Khabarovsk, Amur region, Sakhalin, southern Kuriles).

References

External links
Korean Insects
"Acronicta adaucta Warren 1910". Encyclopedia of Life.

Acronicta
Moths of Asia
Moths described in 1909